Wintersong is an album released in 1986 by Paul Winter, featuring the Paul Winter Consort. The album is a collection of lesser known folk melodies from North America and Europe, arranged in a mixed style of jazz and classical, and played with Brazilian rhythms.

Track listing
 "Tomorrow Is My Dancing Day" (Trad. English)
 "Swedish Song" (Gustaf Nordqvist)
 "The Cherry Tree" (Trad. Appalachian)
 "Little One" (Trad. Appalachian)
 "Peasant Revels" (Trad. German and English)
 "Dance Of The Golden Bough" (Trad. Italian)
 "Beautiful Star" (Odetta)
 "Wintersong" (Trad. French)
 "Joy" (J.S.Bach)

Personnel
 Paul Winter – soprano saxophone
 Nancy Rumbel – English horn, oboe
 Rhonda Larson – flute
 Paul Halley – piano, organ, harpsichord
 Dan Carillo – steel-string guitar
 Oscar Castro-Neves – classical guitar
 Eugene Friesen – cello
 Russ Landau – bass
 Guilherme Franco – snare drum
 Marcio Supal – cuica, whistle
 Neil Clark – donno, bells, percussion
 Ted Moore – orchestra bells, surdo, percussion

References
"Wintersong." Living Music.

1986 albums
Living Music albums
Paul Winter albums